Franck Honorat (born 11 August 1996) is a French professional footballer who plays as a winger for Ligue 1 club Brest.

Club career

Nice
Honorat made his Ligue 1 debut at 3 November 2013 in a 2–1 home defeat against Bordeaux replacing Christian Brüls after 87 minutes.

Saint-Étienne
In August 2018, Honorat signed with Ligue 1 side Saint-Étienne. He was loaned back to Clermont of Ligue 2 to finish the 2018–19 season there.

Brest
On 1 July 2020, Honorat signed a five-year contract with Brest. The deal was worth €5 million. He scored his first goal with Brest on 20 September against Lorient.

Career statistics

Honours 
Saint-Étienne

 Coupe de France runner-up: 2019–20

References

External links
 
 
 

1996 births
Living people
Association football wingers
France youth international footballers
French footballers
Ligue 1 players
Ligue 2 players
Championnat National 2 players
Championnat National 3 players
OGC Nice players
FC Sochaux-Montbéliard players
Clermont Foot players
AS Saint-Étienne players
Stade Brestois 29 players